Mariage Frères (French, Mariage Brothers) is a French gourmet tea company, based in Paris. It was founded on 1 June 1854 by brothers Henri and Edouard Mariage.

History

The tea trade in France began to boom in the middle of the 17th century. At this time, King Louis XIV and the French East India Company encouraged the exploration of distant lands in the search of exotic goods. Around 1660, Nicolas and Pierre Mariage began voyaging on behalf of the royal court: Pierre was sent to Madagascar on a mission for the French East India Company, while Nicolas made several trips to Persia and India before being named part of an official deputation sent by Louis XIV to sign a trade agreement with the Shah of Persia. Successive generations of the Mariage family remained in the tea trade and in 1843, by then reflecting their experience and knowledge of the tea trade, members of the Mariage family opened their first wholesale shop in Paris.
 
On 1 June 1854 Henri and Edouard Mariage, founded the present-day Mariage Frères Tea Company. For over 130 years the company was managed by four generations of Mariage tea merchants who maintained a wholesale-only business from their Parisian warehouse. The business consisted of importing premium quality leaf teas from the Orient, which were then traded to first class hotels and tea shops in France.

In 1983 the company transformed itself from a wholesale import firm into a retail company. Under the leadership of Kitti Cha Sangmanee and Richard Bueno, Mariage Frères started opening tea houses within central Paris. The first tea emporium and tea salon, located on rue du Bourg-Tibourg, opened in the same building where Henri Mariage had his offices over 150 years ago. The 19th-century colonial and exotic furniture, cash registers, counters and tea instruments come from the historic former tea office and deposit in Rue du Cloître-Saint-Merri.

Today, the company operates over 30 Mariage Frères points-of-sale within France, the United Kingdom, Germany and Japan. There are five Mariage Frères tearooms in Paris.
The brand is also distributed through a network of resellers in over 60 countries, served in grand hotels such as the Meurice in Paris, Claridge's in London, Mandarin Oriental Hotel in Bangkok and Singapore as well as being offered to first-class voyagers on Japan Airlines.

In the early 2000s, an online shop (available in French, English, and Japanese) with worldwide distribution was launched.

There is one unique production platform in Paris for Europe, as well as for the rest of the world, and another platform for distribution only in Japan.

References in popular culture
In Episode 11, Season 3 of American TV series Gossip Girl, Blair's mother, Eleanor, returns from a trip to Paris. Blair suspects her mother has been keeping a big secret from her. When she suggests that her mother opens an envelope she had just received, Eleanor replies: "But tea first. I have the most amazing Lapsang Souchong from Mariage Frères".

References

External links
 A history of Mariage Frères in cosmopolis.ch

Tea companies of France
French brands
Tea brands
Shops in Paris
French companies established in 1854